The districts of Botswana are subdivided into sub-districts. The sub-districts are listed below, by district:

Central District
 Bobirwa, headquarters at Bobonong
 Boteti, headquarters at Letlhakane
 Lerala
 Mahalapye
 Mmadinare
 Mmaphashalala
 Mogorosi
 Nata
 Paje
 Rakops
 Sebina
 Sefhare
 Serowe/Palapye
 Shoshong
 Taupye
 Tonota, split from Tutume
 Tutume
 Lecheng
[
[orapa]]

Chobe District
 Kasane

Ghanzi District
 Charleshill
 Ghanzi headquarters at New Xhade

Kgalagadi District
 Hukuntsi
 Kang
 Tshabong
Khawa
Werda
Makopong
Omaweneno  
Tsabong  
Kolonkwane 
Middlepits 
Khuis  
Gachibana  
Bokspits 
Struizendam  
Phepheng/Draaihoek  
Maubelo
Kokotsha 
Maralaleng  
Maleshe

Kgatleng District
 Mmathubudukwane
Mochudi
Bokaa
Oodi
Modipane
Mabalane
Sikwane
Malolwane
Ramonaka
Oliphants Drift/ Dikgonnye
Artesia
Malotwana
Leshibitse
Ramathabaki
Kgomodiatshaba

Kweneng District
 Letlhakeng
 Molepolole

North-East District
 Francistown
 Masunga

North-West District/Ngamiland District
 Ngamiland East (aka Ngamiland South), headquartered at Maun
 Ngamiland West (aka Ngamiland North)
 Okavango (aka Ngamiland Delta, Okavango Delta), headquartered at Gumare

South-East District
 Gaborone
 Mogobane
 Otse 
 Ramotswa
 Tlokweng

Southern District
 Goodhope
 Jwaneng
 Kanye
 Mabutsane
 Moshupa

See also
Districts of Botswana

Notes and references

 
Subdivisions of Botswana
Botswana, Subdistricts
Botswana 2
Subdistricts, Botswana
Botswana geography-related lists